Nexway is a French software and service company for ecommerce and payment.  

Nexway enables companies to sell their software and services online in more than 140 countries by connecting their e-store to its e-commerce and payment platform.

Avast, Eset,  Fnac Darty, Kaspersky and Veepee are amongst Nexway's. 

Headquartered in Paris (France), and with offices in Nîmes (France), Katowice (Poland), Milan (Italy), San Francisco (USA), and Tokyo (Japan), the company has 100 employees and generated a 95M€ turnover in 2019. And you can visit another Nex V site here

History 

Nexway was created in 2002 to distribute software to consumers under the name Téléchargement.fr (meaning “download” in French).   

 In January 2009, Nexway acquires Boonty (en), and enters the market of casual video games’ distribution.
 The Company then adds new ecommerce services to its portfolio to help software companies sell online: shopping cart, payment processing, subscription management, customer care…  
 In October 2018, Nexway SAS and its affiliates are grouped within the same holding company Nexway Group AG. 
 In January 2019, the German company asknet AG acquires 100% of Nexway Group AG.
 In July 2019 asknet AG renames into Nexway AG. Both companies operate under the same brand since then.
 In April 2020, asknet AG sells Nexway Group AG to the Swiss holding company BPI Bureau de Promotion Immobilière SA, which becomes the sole shareholder of the Nexway Group AG.

Offer 

Nexway Monetize: payment and ecommerce platform to manage the shopping cart, handle payment in more than 140 countries, run subscriptions, invoicing, manage local tax and compliance to local regulations globally. The SaaS platform is based on microservices and APIs and is complemented by managed services such as customer care and marketing campaign management.
Nexway Connect: a digital distribution network that connects software and video games publishers with popular online merchants. The Connect platform acts as a single point of channel management for software companies, and is a lever for audience monetization for merchants that can diversify their offer with a 7000+ titles catalog of ready-to-sell software and games.

References 

Companies established in 2002
Online companies of France
Multinational companies